Colnettia is a monotypic moth genus of the family Erebidae. Its only species, Colnettia brinoni, is found in New Caledonia in the south-west Pacific Ocean. Both the genus and the species were first described by Jeremy Daniel Holloway in 1979.

References

Calpinae
Monotypic moth genera